"Endless Art" is a song by Irish indie rock band A House, released initially as the lead track on the Bingo EP (1991), and then as a single from their 1991 album I Am the Greatest. It was later included on the greatest hits album The Way We Were.

After the commercial failure of their 1990 album I Want Too Much, A House had been dropped from their label Blanco y Negro Records, to be picked up by the indie label Setanta Records. They quickly released the EPs Doodle and Bingo at the end of 1990 and in 1991. The latter included the first appearance of "Endless Art", which A House recorded with Edwyn Collins as producer. Collins went on to work with them on I Am the Greatest from which "Endless Art" was re-released as a single, accompanied by a video.

Although the song did not enjoy huge chart success, it reached number 46 in the UK - an achievement by A House's standards - and it gained a certain amount of airplay on MTV Europe. The lyrics to "Endless Art" begin with the line "All art is quite useless according to Oscar Wilde" and for their remainder are mostly a list of the names and birth and death dates of artists from various fields, with the chorus remark: "all dead but still alive, in endless time and endless art". This "list" style of song is characteristic of many of Dave Couse's songs. The majority of the lyrics are declaimed rather than sung, over a repetitive electric guitar motif. Melodically, the song features a quotation from Beethoven's Fifth Symphony in the chorus.

Video
"Endless Art" was accompanied by an innovative stop-motion video which received a lot of praise. When Paul King played the video on his final MTV's Greatest Hits show, as one "of those videos that I really do think deserve to be called great and classic", alongside others such as "Thriller" and "Ashes to Ashes".

Sexism
For the first appearance of the song on Bingo, the band received some criticism for the fact that the artists listed in the song are all male, so they recorded a second version where all the artists are female. This is the version called "More Endless Art". In "More Endless Art", the melodic quotation from Beethoven is substituted with one from Carl Orff, who, it might be quibbled, is not a woman, while the substitution of Walt Disney's Minnie Mouse for his Mickey Mouse may not quite right the gender balance either. Still, "More Endless Art" was better than a defense Dave Couse had offered in interviews, that the band had thought that Joan Miró was a woman.

Updated version
Dave Couse has subsequently performed a live version of "Endless Art" with a new list of artists, those deceased since the original release of the song. This is available as "Endless Art 06" on the B-side of his 2006 single "A Celebration".

Track listings
"Endless Art" single (1992)
 "Endless Art"
 "Freak Show"*
 "More Endless Art"
 "Charity"*
∗ From a live recording for a John Peel session on February 2, 1992.
 All songs written by A House.
 Produced by Edwyn Collins (1, 3) and Dale Griffin (2, 4).

Bingo EP (1991)
 "Endless Art"
 "Our Love Is Good Enough"
 "Slipping Away"
 "Baby You're Too Much"
 All songs written by A House.

References

External links
 Endless Art video on YouTube
 More Endless Art on YouTube (version retaining Beethoven chorus, not Orff; video visuals by YouTube user)

1992 singles
1991 songs
Animated music videos
Irish rock songs
List songs
Setanta Records singles
Stop-motion animated music videos
Works about artists